David Michael Doogan (born 4 March 1973) is a Scottish National Party (SNP) politician who was elected as the Member of Parliament (MP) for Angus in the 2019 United Kingdom general election, after defeating incumbent Conservative candidate Kirstene Hair. He has been serving as SNP Spokesperson for Defence since December 2022.

Early life and career 
Doogan was born on 4 March 1973 in Perth to Irish parents James and Annie ( Walsh) Doogan. 

He was a civilian in the Royal Navy from 1989 to 2007. He served as an Apprentice Aircraft Engineer from 1989 to 1993, also working in repair and overhaul of Helicopter Transmission, specialising in Sea King Search and Rescue Aircraft, as a surveyor, team leader, supervisor, operations planning manager, Sea King and Lynx Transmissions Production Manager and in Commercial Management.

A former aircraft engineer with the Ministry of Defence, Doogan left his successful career in the civil service in 2007 to pursue a career in politics. Doogan graduated in 2011 from the University of Dundee with a First Class MA (Hons) in Politics and International Relations. From 2011 to 2016, he was a caseworker for the office of John Swinney MSP. Doogan was co-owner of Perthshire Garden and Property from 2016 to 2019.

Perth and Kinross Council 
Doogan was elected to Perth and Kinross Council as a councillor for Perth City North in 2012, with the largest share of first preference votes in that ward. Upon election, Doogan became Convenor of Housing and Health, having responsibility for council housing, social care, and a seat on the board of NHS Tayside.

Doogan was reelected to PKC in 2017, increasing his share of the vote by 4.02%. At the election he became the leader of the SNP group on Perth and Kinross Council, and as such, Leader of the Opposition. Following his election, he delivered a speech about the Gaelic language in which he said: "Let us not reflect on concerns that we have been under the heel of foreign influence and power for over 300 years. The island of Britain is no longer subject to the actions of quislings who may seek to see smaller cultures extinguished on an island of coffins by red coats."

After his election to Parliament in December 2019 Doogan announced his intention to stand down as a councillor in 2020, with the timing of his resignation subject to the Chief Executive of PKC scheduling a by election.

House of Commons 

Upon the announcement of the 2019 general election Doogan was selected as the SNP candidate for Angus. He won election on 12 December 2019 after defeating the incumbent Conservative MP Kirstene Hair, and was sworn into Parliament on 18 December.

Doogan became the SNP Spokesperson for Agriculture and Rural Affairs on 7 January 2020. On 16 October 2020, he also became Spokesperson for Manufacturing.

Personal life 
Doogan married Gillian Kirk in 1999; they have a son and daughter.

Electoral history

Perth and Kinross Council

House of Commons

References

External links 

 

Living people
Scottish National Party MPs
UK MPs 2019–present
Scottish National Party councillors
1973 births
People from Perth, Scotland
Alumni of the University of Dundee
Scottish people of Irish descent